WPXV-TV (channel 49) is a television station licensed to Norfolk, Virginia, United States, serving as the Ion Television affiliate for the Hampton Roads area. Owned by Inyo Broadcast Holdings, the station has studios on Nansemond Parkway in Suffolk, Virginia, adjacent to the transmitter tower it shares with ABC affiliate WVEC (channel 13).

History

WJCB
On August 9, 1985, Tidewater Christian Communications received the construction permit for a new channel 49 television station at Norfolk. Tidewater Christian, controlled by several Black ministers from Hampton Roads-area churches, set up shop in the former WVEC studios in Hampton and built WJCB. The station would broadcast religious programming and family-oriented secular shows. The first general manager was Dwight Green, son of Church of God in Christ bishop Samuel L. Green Jr.

Channel 49 signed on the air May 29, 1989. At the outset, WJCB was hampered by a weak signal, and local cable companies refused to add the new station to their lineups. It did not appear on some Hampton Roads systems until must-carry rules were reinstated in 1993.

In 1994, WJCB went through a management change, as stockholders successfully pushed for a court order to install a new board to manage the money-losing station. Under new management, WJCB added home shopping programming from ViaTV in 1994, in an attempt to boost its revenue. A year later, the station dropped ViaTV for programs from the new America One network and Infomall, an infomercial service owned by Paxson Communications Corporation; these aired alongside music videos and religious programs.

Lockwood Broadcasting purchased WJCB from Tidewater Christian Communications in 1996 for $6.75 million. Lockwood already owned a network of low-power TV stations headed by WPEN-LP. The company moved to spend $1.5 million on an improved transmitter for channel 49 and new studio facilities and to move the syndicated inventory of WPEN to the full-power station.

Lockwood had no intention of selling the newly purchased WJCB; however, Paxson presented it with an offer to buy the station for $14.75 million—more than twice what Lockwood had paid to purchase it from Tidewater Christian—and the sale to Paxson was announced in December.

WPXV-TV

Paxson Communications changed the WJCB call letters from WJCB to WPXV on March 2, 1998. Religious programming and infomercials as well as shopping programming continued to air on WPXV until August 31, when the station started airing Pax programming in the late afternoons and evenings with infomercials and religious programming during the day, with the launch of the then-new Pax network. WPXV aired rebroadcasts of WAVY-TV's 6 p.m. and 11 p.m. weeknight newscasts at 7 p.m. and 11:30 p.m. weeknights from 2003 to 2004 and had master control in WAVY's studios until 2004 when Paxson and NBC broke up the agreement.

Technical information

Subchannels
The station's digital signal is multiplexed:

The Worship Network was previously seen on WPXV-TV's fourth digital subchannel; however, Ion dropped The Worship Network on all Ion owned and operated stations on January 31, 2010, at midnight.

Analog-to-digital conversion
WPXV-TV discontinued regular programming on its analog signal, over UHF channel 49, on June 12, 2009, as part of the federally mandated transition from analog to digital television. The station's digital signal remained on its pre-transition UHF channel 46, using PSIP to display WPXV-TV's virtual channel as 49 on digital television receivers.

References

External links 

Ion Television affiliates
Scripps News affiliates
Ion Mystery affiliates
Defy TV affiliates
TrueReal affiliates
Laff (TV network) affiliates
Television channels and stations established in 1989
1989 establishments in Virginia
PXV-TV
Norfolk, Virginia